This is a list of 565 species in Chrysotus, a genus of long-legged flies in the family Dolichopodidae.

Chrysotus species

Chrysotus abatus Wei, Zhang & Zhou, 2014
Chrysotus abditus Wei, Zhang & Zhou, 2014
Chrysotus abdominus Wei, Zhang & Zhou, 2014
Chrysotus ablutus Wei, Zhang & Zhou, 2014
Chrysotus abnormus Wei, Zhang & Zhou, 2014
Chrysotus acuminatus Wei, Zhang & Zhou, 2014
Chrysotus acuticornis Becker, 1922
Chrysotus acutus Aldrich, 1896
Chrysotus adflictus Wei, Zhang & Zhou, 2014
Chrysotus adsiduus Becker, 1922
Chrysotus adunatus Wei & Zhang, 2010
Chrysotus affinis Loew, 1861
Chrysotus africanus (Parent, 1934)
Chrysotus agalmus Harmston & Rapp, 1968
Chrysotus agraulus Wei & Zhang, 2010
Chrysotus albibarbus Loew, 1857
Chrysotus albihirtipes Robinson, 1975
Chrysotus albipalpus Aldrich, 1896
Chrysotus albohirtus Van Duzee, 1924
Chrysotus aldrichi (Van Duzee, 1915)
Chrysotus alpicola Strobl, 1893
Chrysotus altavaginas Liu, Wang & Yang, 2013
Chrysotus alternus Becker, 1922
Chrysotus amabilis Parent, 1931
Chrysotus amicus (Parent, 1931)
Chrysotus amplus Wei, Zhang & Zhou, 2014
Chrysotus amurensis Negrobov, 1980
Chrysotus anacolus Wei, Zhang & Zhou, 2014
Chrysotus andrei Negrobov, 1986
Chrysotus angulicornis Kowarz, 1874
Chrysotus angulus Wei, Zhang & Zhou, 2014
Chrysotus angustifrons (Robinson, 1975)
Chrysotus angustus Wei, 2012
Chrysotus annulipes Meigen, 1824
Chrysotus anomalus Malloch, 1914
Chrysotus anshunus Wei & Zhang, 2010
Chrysotus anticus Wei, Zhang & Zhou, 2014
Chrysotus antillensis Runyon, 2020
Chrysotus aperturus Wei, 2018
Chrysotus apicibifidus Wei, 2018
Chrysotus apicicaudatus Wei & Zhang, 2010
Chrysotus apicidentus Wei & Yang, 2007
Chrysotus apicilobulus Wei, 2018
Chrysotus apicirotundus Wei, 2018
Chrysotus apicisetosus Wei, 2018
Chrysotus apicispinus Wei, 2018
Chrysotus apiculatus Wei, Zhang & Zhou, 2014
Chrysotus aptus Wei, Zhang & Zhou, 2014
Chrysotus araeobasus Wei, Zhang & Zhou, 2014
Chrysotus arcticus Frey, 1915
Chrysotus arcus Wei, Zhang & Zhou, 2014
Chrysotus arduus Parent, 1934
Chrysotus argentatus Van Duzee, 1924
Chrysotus arkansensis Van Duzee, 1930
Chrysotus artatus Wei, Zhang & Zhou, 2014
Chrysotus artiosus Wei, Zhang & Zhou, 2014
Chrysotus atopopterus Bickel in Bickel & Martin, 2016
Chrysotus atratus Van Duzee, 1930
Chrysotus auratus Loew, 1861
Chrysotus austrotropicus Bickel, 2013
Chrysotus badius Van Duzee, 1932
Chrysotus baerti Bickel & Sinclair, 1997
Chrysotus baicalensis Negrobov & Maslova, 1995
Chrysotus bajaensis Harmston, 1968
Chrysotus barbipes Van Duzee, 1932
Chrysotus barretoi Becker, 1908
Chrysotus basalus Wei, Zhang & Zhou, 2014
Chrysotus beijingensis Wang & Yang, 2006
Chrysotus bellax Parent, 1933
Chrysotus bellulus Van Duzee, 1932
Chrysotus bellus Van Duzee, 1924
Chrysotus bermudensis Johnson, 1914
Chrysotus bicercusi Liu & Yang, 2017
Chrysotus bifurcatus Wang & Yang, 2008
Chrysotus bigoti Parent, 1932
Chrysotus binarius Wei, Zhang & Zhou, 2014
Chrysotus biprojicienus Wei & Zhang, 2010
Chrysotus biseta (Olejníček, 2004)
Chrysotus blepharosceles Kowarz, 1874
Chrysotus bracteatus Van Duzee, 1924
Chrysotus brasiliensis Van Duzee, 1933
Chrysotus brevicercus Wang & Yang, 2008
Chrysotus brevicornis Van Duzee, 1933
Chrysotus brevipulvillus Wei, 2018
Chrysotus brevitibia Van Duzee, 1927
Chrysotus brooksi Negrobov. Selivanova & Maslova, 2013
Chrysotus caerulescens Negrobov, 1980
Chrysotus caerulus Van Duzee, 1924
Chrysotus calcaratus Van Duzee, 1930
Chrysotus californicus Van Duzee, 1924
Chrysotus callichromoides Runyon, 2020
Chrysotus callichromus Robinson, 1975
Chrysotus canadensis Van Duzee, 1924
Chrysotus carolinensis Robinson, 1964
Chrysotus caudadus Wei, 2018
Chrysotus caudatulus Van Duzee, 1932
Chrysotus caudatus Van Duzee, 1924
Chrysotus cerciaffiliatus Liu, Wang & Yang, 2016
Chrysotus chaetipalpus Parent, 1933
Chrysotus chaetoproctus Parent, 1933
Chrysotus chandleri Negrobov, Naglis & Maslova, 2016
Chrysotus chetifer Parent, 1934
Chrysotus chishuiensis Wei, 2018
Chrysotus chlanoflavus Harmston & Knowlton, 1940
Chrysotus chloricus Van Duzee, 1911
Chrysotus choricus Wheeler, 1890
Chrysotus chukotkensis Grichanov, 2012
Chrysotus ciliatus (Becker, 1922)
Chrysotus cilipes Meigen, 1824
Chrysotus cilitibia Maslova & Negrobov, 2015
Chrysotus clypeatus Robinson, 1967
Chrysotus cockerellae Curran, 1929
Chrysotus collini Parent, 1923
Chrysotus coloradensis Van Duzee, 1924
Chrysotus combinatus Zhou & Wei, 2017
Chrysotus comminus Wei, 2018
Chrysotus compactilus Wei, Zhang & Zhou, 2014
Chrysotus concavus Wei, 2018
Chrysotus concinnus Zetterstedt, 1843
Chrysotus conicus Wei, Zhang & Zhou, 2014
Chrysotus convergens Van Duzee, 1924
Chrysotus coquitos Capellari, 2015
Chrysotus corbieri Parent, 1934
Chrysotus cordisus Wei, Zhang & Zhou, 2014
Chrysotus corniger Negrobov & Maslova, 1995
Chrysotus cornutus Loew, 1862
Chrysotus costalis Loew, 1861
Chrysotus crassitarsis Parent, 1939
Chrysotus crassus Wei, Zhang & Zhou, 2014
Chrysotus cressoni Van Duzee, 1924
Chrysotus crosbyi Van Duzee, 1924
Chrysotus cryptolobus Wei, 2018
Chrysotus cubanus Botosaneanu & Vaillant, 1973
Chrysotus cultellus Wei, Zhang & Zhou, 2014
Chrysotus cupreus Macquart, 1827
Chrysotus currani Van Duzee, 1924
Chrysotus curvatus Wei, Zhang & Zhou, 2014
Chrysotus curvisystylus Wei, Zhang & Zhou, 2014
Chrysotus dakotensis Harmston, 1952
Chrysotus daozhenus Wei, 2018
Chrysotus decipiens Negrobov & Tsurikov, 2000
†Chrysotus decorus Meunier, 1907
Chrysotus defensus Negrobov & Maslova, 2000
Chrysotus degener Frey, 1917
Chrysotus denticornis Lamb, 1932
Chrysotus dentus Wei, Zhang & Zhou, 2014
Chrysotus diaoluoshanus Liu, Bian, Wang & Yang, 2016
Chrysotus diaphorus Parent, 1939
Chrysotus digitus Wei, Zhang & Zhou, 2014
Chrysotus dischmaensis Naglis, 2010
Chrysotus discolor Loew, 1861
Chrysotus discretus Becker, 1922
Chrysotus distalus Wei, Zhang & Zhou, 2014
Chrysotus distinctus Van Duzee, 1924
Chrysotus divergens Parent, 1941
Chrysotus diversus Parent, 1933
Chrysotus dividus Wei, Zhang & Zhou, 2014
Chrysotus dividuus Van Duzee, 1924
Chrysotus djaneti Vaillant, 1953
Chrysotus dorli Negrobov, 1980
Chrysotus dorsalis Van Duzee, 1924
Chrysotus drakei Negrobov, Selivanova & Maslova, 2016
Chrysotus duyunensis Wei, Zhang & Zhou, 2014
Chrysotus ealensis (Parent, 1936)
Chrysotus elongatus Parent, 1934
Chrysotus emarginatus Van Duzee, 1928
Chrysotus emeiensis Wang & Yang, 2008
Chrysotus eques Parent, 1931
Chrysotus erectus Wei, 2018
Chrysotus errans Parent, 1931
Chrysotus exceptus Becker, 1922
Chrysotus excisicornis Parent, 1935
Chrysotus excisus Aldrich, 1896
Chrysotus excretus Becker, 1922
Chrysotus exilis Van Duzee, 1924
Chrysotus fanjingshanus Wei & Zhang, 2010
Chrysotus femoratus Zetterstedt, 1843
Chrysotus flatus Wei, 2018
Chrysotus flavicauda Van Duzee, 1928
Chrysotus flavimaculatus Van Duzee, 1929
Chrysotus flavipedus Wei, 2012
Chrysotus flavipes (Aldrich, 1896)
Chrysotus flavisetus Malloch, 1914
Chrysotus flexilignus Wei, 2018
Chrysotus flexus Wei, 2018
Chrysotus foliosus Wei, Zhang & Zhou, 2014
Chrysotus fortunatus Negrobov & Maslova, 2000
Chrysotus frontalis Van Duzee, 1924
Chrysotus fujianensis Wang & Yang, 2008
Chrysotus fulvohirtus Van Duzee, 1915
Chrysotus furcatus Robinson, 1964
Chrysotus fuscitibialis Wei & Zhang, 2010
Chrysotus fuscoluteus Negrobov & Zurikov, 1986
Chrysotus fusiformus Wei, Zhang & Zhou, 2014
Chrysotus fusiformusoides Wei, Zhang & Zhou, 2014
Chrysotus ganpuensis Wei, Zhang & Zhou, 2014
Chrysotus gaoligongshanus Wei, Zhang & Zhou, 2014
Chrysotus giganteus Parent, 1931
Chrysotus gilvipes Van Duzee, 1924
Chrysotus givus Wei, 2018
Chrysotus glebi Negrobov & Maslova, 1995
Chrysotus globosus Wei, 2018
Chrysotus gracilus Wei, Zhang & Zhou, 2014
Chrysotus gramineus (Fallén, 1823)
Chrysotus grandicornis Parent, 1930
Chrysotus granus Wei, Zhang & Zhou, 2014
Chrysotus gratiosus Becker, 1922
Chrysotus guangxiensis Liu, Liang & Yang, 2017
Chrysotus guanlingus Wei, 2012
Chrysotus guizhouensis Wang & Yang, 2008
Chrysotus guyanensis Parent, 1934
Chrysotus hainanensis Liu, Bian, Wang & Yang, 2016
Chrysotus halteralis Van Duzee, 1924
Chrysotus halteratus Meuffels & Grootaert, 1996
Chrysotus hamatus (Parent, 1931)
Chrysotus harmstoni Meuffels & Grootaert, 1999
Chrysotus hastatus Van Duzee, 1924
Chrysotus herbus Wei, 2012
Chrysotus heterophallus Wei, 2018
Chrysotus heterosus Wei, 2018
Chrysotus hiatus Wei, Zhang & Zhou, 2014
Chrysotus hibernaculus Wei, Zhang & Zhou, 2014
Chrysotus hilburni Woodley, 1996
Chrysotus hirsutus Aldrich, 1896
Chrysotus hirtipes Van Duzee, 1924
Chrysotus hirtus Parent, 1931
Chrysotus huangguoshus Wei, Zhang & Zhou, 2014
Chrysotus hubeiensis Wang & Yang, 2008
Chrysotus humilis Parent, 1928
Chrysotus hypnususi Liu & Yang, 2017
Chrysotus iconus Wei, Zhang & Zhou, 2014
Chrysotus idahoensis Van Duzee, 1924
Chrysotus imitator Becker, 1922
Chrysotus impensus Wei, Zhang & Zhou, 2014
Chrysotus incisus Parent, 1928
Chrysotus inconspicuus Loew, 1858
Chrysotus indifferens Curran, 1924
Chrysotus inermis Aldrich, 1896
Chrysotus infirmus Parent, 1933
Chrysotus inflatus Wei, Zhang & Zhou, 2014
Chrysotus inopus Wei, Zhang & Zhou, 2014
Chrysotus inornatus Parent, 1933
Chrysotus insolentus Wei, 2018
Chrysotus insularis (Lamb, 1933)
Chrysotus integer Robinson, 1975
Chrysotus interfrons Runyon, 2020
Chrysotus intrudus Harmston, 1951
Chrysotus intumescuntus Wei, 2018
Chrysotus ischnus Wei, Zhang & Zhou, 2014
Chrysotus javanensis de Meijere, 1916
Chrysotus jiaozishanus Zhou & Wei, 2017
Chrysotus jindingensis Wang & Yang, 2008
Chrysotus johnsoni Van Duzee, 1924
Chrysotus junctus Van Duzee, 1924
Chrysotus kallweiti Capellari & Amorim, 2014
Chrysotus kansensis Harmston, 1952
Chrysotus kerguelensis Enderlein, 1909
Chrysotus keyensis Runyon & Capellari, 2018
Chrysotus kholsa Hollis, 1964
Chrysotus kirejtshuki Negrobov, Selivanova & Maslova, 2016
Chrysotus komovi Negrobov, Barkalov & Selivanova, 2014
Chrysotus krummus Wei, Zhang & Zhou, 2014
Chrysotus kuankuoshuiensis Wei, 2018
Chrysotus kumazawai Negrobov, Maslova & Fursov, 2015
Chrysotus lacidus Wei, Zhang & Zhou, 2014
Chrysotus laciniatus Becker, 1919
Chrysotus lacustrus Wei, Zhang & Zhou, 2014
Chrysotus laesus (Wiedemann, 1817)
Chrysotus laetaminus Wei, Zhang & Zhou, 2014
Chrysotus lamellicaudatus Robinson, 1975
Chrysotus lamellifer Robinson, 1964
Chrysotus laminatus Becker, 1922
Chrysotus laminus Wei, 2018
Chrysotus lanceolatus Wei, Zhang & Zhou, 2014
Chrysotus lanciniatus Wei, 2018
Chrysotus langfengguanus Wei, 2018
Chrysotus larachensis Grichanov, Nourti & Kettani, 2020
Chrysotus largipalpus Wei, 2012
Chrysotus largitriangulus Wei, Zhang & Zhou, 2014
Chrysotus larifugus Wei, 2018
Chrysotus latealatus Vanschuytbroeck, 1951
Chrysotus latilus Wei, Zhang & Zhou, 2014
Chrysotus laxifacialus Wei & Zhang, 2010
†Chrysotus lepidus Meunier, 1907
Chrysotus leigongshanus Wei & Yang, 2007
Chrysotus leptysmus Wei, Zhang & Zhou, 2014
Chrysotus leucosetus Harmston, 1971
Chrysotus leucostoma (Loew, 1861)
Chrysotus licinus Wei, Zhang & Zhou, 2014
Chrysotus limosus Wei, Zhang & Zhou, 2014
Chrysotus lingulatus Wei, Zhang & Zhou, 2014
Chrysotus litoralis Robinson, 1964
Chrysotus liui Wang & Yang, 2008
Chrysotus ljutengensis Negrobov & Zurikov, 1986
Chrysotus lobatus Wei, 2018
Chrysotus lobipes Parent, 1934
Chrysotus logvinovskii Negrobov & Tsurikov, 2000
Chrysotus longaevus Wei, 2018
Chrysotus longgongensis Wei, 2018
Chrysotus longiconicus Wei, Zhang & Zhou, 2014
Chrysotus longicornus Wei, 2012
Chrysotus longihirtus Van Duzee, 1932
Chrysotus longimanus Loew, 1861
Chrysotus longinquus Wei, Zhang & Zhou, 2014
Chrysotus longipalpus Aldrich, 1896
Chrysotus longiprojicienus Wei, Zhang & Zhou, 2014
Chrysotus longipulvillus Wei, 2018
Chrysotus longisetus Wei, 2018
Chrysotus longiventris Van Duzee, 1931
Chrysotus longus Wei, Zhang & Zhou, 2014
Chrysotus luoyangensis Wang & Yang, 2008
Chrysotus luteipalpus (Parent, 1929)
Chrysotus lvguantunus Wei, 2012
Chrysotus lygistus Wei, Zhang & Zhou, 2014
Chrysotus maculatus (Parent, 1930)
Chrysotus maculatus (Parent, 1934) (homonym of above?)
Chrysotus madidus Wei & Yang, 2007
Chrysotus magnus Wei, Zhang & Zhou, 2014
Chrysotus magnuscaputus Liu, Bian, Wang & Yang, 2016
Chrysotus major Van Duzee, 1924
Chrysotus malachiticus Speiser, 1910
Chrysotus masunagai Negrobov, Kumazawa & Tago, 2016
Chrysotus mccreadiei Runyon & Capellari, 2018
Chrysotus mediocaudatus Robinson, 1975
Chrysotus mediotinctus (Becker, 1922)
Chrysotus megalocerus Meuffels & Grootaert, 1999
Chrysotus melampodius Loew, 1857
Chrysotus metatarsatus Becker, 1922
Chrysotus microtatus Meuffels & Grootaert, 1999
Chrysotus micrus Wei, Zhang & Zhou, 2014
Chrysotus millardi Meuffels & Grootaert, 1999
Chrysotus milvadu Runyon, 2020
Chrysotus minor Parent, 1931
Chrysotus minusculus Wei, Zhang & Zhou, 2014
Chrysotus minuticapillatus Liu, Przhiboro & Yang in Wang, Liu, Przhiboro & Yang, 2016
Chrysotus minuticornis Van Duzee, 1927
Chrysotus minutus Wei, Zhang & Zhou, 2014
Chrysotus mirandus Van Duzee, 1927
Chrysotus miripalpus Parent, 1928
Chrysotus mobilis Becker, 1924
Chrysotus modestus Parent, 1928
Chrysotus monochaetus Kowarz, 1874
Chrysotus monticola Negrobov & Maslova, 1995
Chrysotus montserratensis Runyon, 2020
Chrysotus morrisoni Van Duzee, 1924
Chrysotus motuoensis Liu, Wang & Yang, 2013
Chrysotus mucronatus Wei, Zhang & Zhou, 2014
Chrysotus mundus (Loew, 1861)
Chrysotus muricatus Wei, Zhang & Zhou, 2014
Chrysotus mystax Runyon & Capellari, 2018
Chrysotus namaicunensis Liu, Wang & Yang, 2013
Chrysotus nanjiangus Wei, 2018
Chrysotus nanjingensis Wang & Yang, 2008
Chrysotus nanus Parent, 1928
Chrysotus negansus Wei, Zhang & Zhou, 2014
Chrysotus neglectus (Wiedemann, 1817)
Chrysotus neimengguensis Liu, Wang & Yang, 2016
Chrysotus neopedionomus Capellari, 2015
Chrysotus neopicticornis Robinson, 1967
Chrysotus neoselandensis Parent, 1933
Chrysotus neotropicus Dyte, 1980
Chrysotus nigerus Wei, Zhang & Zhou, 2014
Chrysotus nigerusoides Wei, Zhang & Zhou, 2014
Chrysotus nigriciliatus Van Duzee, 1933
Chrysotus nigrifrons Parent, 1929
Chrysotus nigripalpis Van Duzee, 1924
Chrysotus nigrisetus Zhou & Wei, 2017
Chrysotus nitidus Zhou & Wei, 2017
Chrysotus noctus Wei, Zhang & Zhou, 2014
Chrysotus nudipes Van Duzee, 1924
Chrysotus nudisetus Negrobov & Maslova, 1995
Chrysotus nudus Becker, 1918
Chrysotus obliquus Loew, 1861
Chrysotus oblongus (Parent, 1928)
Chrysotus obscuripes Zetterstedt, 1838
Chrysotus occidentalis (Van Duzee, 1915)
Chrysotus occultus Wei, Zhang & Zhou, 2014
Chrysotus ochropus Thomson, 1869
Chrysotus ochthus Wei, Zhang & Zhou, 2014
Chrysotus olerus Wei, Zhang & Zhou, 2014
Chrysotus opeatus Wei, Zhang & Zhou, 2014
Chrysotus orichalceus Gosseries, 1989
Chrysotus orientalis Negrobov & Tsurikov, 2000
Chrysotus ovalicornis Parent, 1934
Chrysotus ovarius Wei, Zhang & Zhou, 2014
Chrysotus pachystoma Capellari, 2015
Chrysotus pallidus Wei & Zhang, 2010
Chrysotus pallipes Loew, 1861
Chrysotus palmatus (Vanschuytbroeck, 1952)
Chrysotus palparis Becker, 1922
Chrysotus palpatus Parent, 1928
Chrysotus palpiger (Wheeler, 1890)
Chrysotus palustris Verrall, 1876
Chrysotus pandanus Wei, 2018
Chrysotus pandus Wei, 2018
Chrysotus papuanus Meuffels & Grootaert, 1996
Chrysotus paradoxus Aldrich, 1902
Chrysotus parallelus Wei, Zhang & Zhou, 2014
Chrysotus parapicalis Bickel & Dyte, 1989
Chrysotus parastylus Wei, 2018
Chrysotus paratinus Wei, Zhang & Zhou, 2014
Chrysotus paratrullus Wei, 2018
Chrysotus parilis Parent, 1926
Chrysotus parvicornis Van Duzee, 1924
Chrysotus parvipalpus Van Duzee, 1931
Chrysotus parvulus (Aldrich, 1896)
Chrysotus pasccus Wei, 2018
Chrysotus pauli Meuffels & Grootaert, 1999
Chrysotus pauliansulus Wei, Zhang & Zhou, 2014
Chrysotus pectoralis Van Duzee, 1924
Chrysotus peculiariter Negrobov & Maslova, 2000
Chrysotus pengzhouensis Wei, Zhang & Zhou, 2014
Chrysotus pennatus Lichtwardt, 1902
Chrysotus peregrinus Parent, 1931
Chrysotus petilus Wei, 2018
Chrysotus philtrum Melander, 1903
Chrysotus picticornis Loew, 1862
Chrysotus pictipes Becker, 1922
Chrysotus pilbarensis Bickel, 2013
Chrysotus pilicornis Becker, 1914
Chrysotus pilitibia Negrobov & Maslova, 1995
Chrysotus piscicaudatus Wei, 2018
Chrysotus plumarista Runyon & Capellari, 2018
Chrysotus polaris Negrobov & Maslova, 2000
Chrysotus polleti Olejníček, 1999
Chrysotus polychaetus Frey, 1945
Chrysotus pomeroyi Parent, 1934
†Chrysotus praeconcinnus Evenhuis, 1994
Chrysotus prominentus Wei, Zhang & Zhou, 2014
Chrysotus propinquus (Becker, 1922)
Chrysotus proximus Aldrich, 1896
Chrysotus pseudexcisus Robinson, 1975
Chrysotus pseudocilipes Hollis, 1964
Chrysotus pseudoniger Robinson, 1975
Chrysotus pudingus Wei, Zhang & Zhou, 2014
Chrysotus pulchellus Kowarz, 1874
Chrysotus pulcher Parent, 1926
Chrysotus pulvillatus Parent, 1920
Chrysotus putus Wei, 2018
Chrysotus pygmaeus Parent, 1934
Chrysotus qianus Wei & Yang, 2007
Chrysotus qingzhenus Zhou & Wei, 2017
Chrysotus quadrangulus Wei, Zhang & Zhou, 2014
Chrysotus quadratus (Van Duzee, 1915)
Chrysotus rautenbergi (Wheeler, 1890)
Chrysotus rectiserialus Wei, 2018
Chrysotus rectisystylus Wei, 2012
Chrysotus rectus Wei, Zhang & Zhou, 2014
Chrysotus renhuaiensis Wei, Zhang & Zhou, 2014
Chrysotus repandus (Van Duzee, 1915)
Chrysotus ringdahli Parent, 1929
Chrysotus robustus (Robinson, 1975):
Chrysotus rostratus Bigot, 1890
Chrysotus rubzovi Negrobov & Maslova, 1995
Chrysotus runyoni Grichanov, 2017
Chrysotus rutshuruensis (Vanschuytbroeck, 1951)
Chrysotus sagittus Wei, 2018
Chrysotus saigusai Negrobov, Kumazawa & Tago, 2016
Chrysotus salientibus Wei, Zhang & Zhou, 2014
Chrysotus separatus Wei, Zhang & Zhou, 2014
Chrysotus serratus Wang & Yang, 2006
Chrysotus setifemurus Wei, Zhang & Zhou, 2014
Chrysotus setifer Parent, 1932
†Chrysotus setosus Giebel, 1856
Chrysotus setulitibius Wei, Zhang & Zhou, 2014
Chrysotus seychellensis Lamb, 1922
Chrysotus shamshevi Negrobov, Selivanova & Maslova, 2016
Chrysotus shanxiensis Liu, Wang & Yang, 2015
Chrysotus shuensis Liu & Yang in Liu, Zhong, Zhang & Yang, 2020
Chrysotus sibiricus Negrobov & Maslova, 1995
Chrysotus silvicola Harmston, 1951
Chrysotus simplicibus Wei, 2018
Chrysotus simulans Van Duzee, 1924
Chrysotus singularis Parent, 1931
Chrysotus sinuolatus Wang & Yang, 2008
Chrysotus smithi Negrobov, 1980
Chrysotus sodalis (Loew, 1861)
Chrysotus soya Runyon, 2022
Chrysotus soleatus Becker, 1922
Chrysotus spectabilis (Loew, 1861)
Chrysotus sphaericus Wei, Zhang & Zhou, 2014
Chrysotus spinipes Van Duzee, 1924
Chrysotus spoliaretus Wei, Zhang & Zhou, 2014
Chrysotus squamae Liu & Yang, 2019
†Chrysotus stanciui Parent, 1936
Chrysotus straeleni Vanschuytbroeck, 1951
Chrysotus suavis Loew, 1857
Chrysotus subapicalis Becker, 1922
Chrysotus subcaudatus Robinson, 1975
Chrysotus subcostatus Loew, 1864
Chrysotus subguanlingus Wei, 2012
Chrysotus subjectus Van Duzee, 1924
Chrysotus sublatus Wei, 2018
Chrysotus sublongicornus Wei, 2012
Chrysotus submuricatus Wei, Zhang & Zhou, 2014
Chrysotus substrictus Wei, Zhang & Zhou, 2014
Chrysotus suiyangus Wei, 2018
Chrysotus supinatus Wei, Zhang & Zhou, 2014
Chrysotus tagoi Negrobov, Maslova & Fursov, 2015
Chrysotus tarsalis Van Duzee, 1924
Chrysotus teapanus Aldrich, 1901
Chrysotus tengchongus Wei, 2018
Chrysotus tennesseensis Robinson, 1964
Chrysotus terminalis Van Duzee, 1924
Chrysotus thornpenis Liu, Wang & Yang, 2015
Chrysotus thornus Wei, Zhang & Zhou, 2014
Chrysotus tibetensis Liu, Wang & Yang, 2013
Chrysotus tibialis Van Duzee, 1924
Chrysotus tortus Wei, Zhang & Zhou, 2014
Chrysotus transversus Wei, 2018
Chrysotus trapezinus Wei & Zhang, 2010
Chrysotus triangularis Van Duzee, 1924
Chrysotus triangulatus (Van Duzee, 1915)
Chrysotus triangulus Wei, Zhang & Zhou, 2014
Chrysotus tricaudatus Negrobov, Barkalov & Selivanova, 2014
Chrysotus tricolor Robinson, 1975
Chrysotus triprojicienus Liu, Liang & Yang, 2017
Chrysotus trullus Wei, 2018
Chrysotus tumidipes Becker, 1922
Chrysotus tumilus Wei, Zhang & Zhou, 2014
Chrysotus uncus Wei, Zhang & Zhou, 2014
Chrysotus undamus Wei, Zhang & Zhou, 2014
Chrysotus unicolor Becker, 1919
Chrysotus uniseriatus Parent, 1933
Chrysotus unumprojicienus Liu & Yang, 2019
Chrysotus upembaensis (Vanschuytbroeck, 1952)
Chrysotus usitatus (Van Duzee, 1915)
Chrysotus vanduzeei (Robinson, 1964)
Chrysotus variabilis (Van Duzee, 1915)
Chrysotus varipes Van Duzee, 1924
Chrysotus velox Parent, 1931
Chrysotus ventriprojicientus Wei, 2018
Chrysotus verecundus Parent, 1933
Chrysotus verralli Parent, 1923
Chrysotus vicinus (Becker, 1922)
Chrysotus viridifemoratus von Roser, 1840
Chrysotus viridis Becker, 1922
Chrysotus virtus Wei, 2018
Chrysotus vividus Loew, 1864
Chrysotus vladimiri Negrobov & Maslova, 1995
Chrysotus vockerothi Pollet in Pollet, Brooks & Cumming, 2004
Chrysotus vulgaris Van Duzee, 1924
Chrysotus vulcanicola Frey, 1945
Chrysotus weii Zhou, 2016
Chrysotus wirthi (Robinson, 1975)
Chrysotus wisconsinensis Wheeler, 1890
Chrysotus wulfi (Parent, 1936)
Chrysotus xanthocal Harmston & Knowlton, 1940
Chrysotus xanthoprasius Bezzi, 1906
Chrysotus xiaolongmensis Wang & Yang, 2006
Chrysotus xiaominae Liu, Liang & Yang, 2017
Chrysotus xinanus Wei & Zhang, 2010
Chrysotus xinjiangensis Wang & Yang, 2008
Chrysotus xiphostoma Robinson, 1975
Chrysotus xishuangbannaensis Wei, 2018
Chrysotus xishuiensis Wei, Zhang & Zhou, 2014
Chrysotus zhangi Wang & Yang, 2008
Chrysotus zhijinus Wei, 2018
Chrysotus zhouae Liu, Bian, Wang & Yang, 2016
Chrysotus zhuae Wang & Yang, 2008
Chrysotus ziphus Wei, Zhang & Zhou, 2014
Chrysotus ziyunus Wei, 2018
Chrysotus zlobiniani Negrobov & Maslova, 1995
Chrysotus zorus Wei, 2018
Chrysotus zumbadoi Capellari, 2015

Unrecognised species:
Chrysotus basalis Philippi, 1865
Chrysotus bicolor Macquart, 1827
Chrysotus chinensis Wiedemann, 1830
Chrysotus concinnarius Say, 1829
Chrysotus deremptus (Walker, 1849)
Chrysotus incertus Walker, 1849
Chrysotus nigripes (Fabricius, 1794)
Chrysotus nubilus Say, 1829
Chrysotus rufipes Meigen, 1838
Chrysotus virescens von Roser, 1840
Chrysotus viridifemora Macquart, 1850

The following species are synonyms of other species:
Chrysotus albifacies (Parent, 1929): Synonym of C. aldrichi (Van Duzee, 1915)
Chrysotus alterum Becker, 1922: Synonym of C. alternus Becker, 1922
Chrysotus amplicornis Kowarz, 1874: Synonym of C. obscuripes Zetterstedt, 1838
Chrysotus amplicornis Zetterstedt, 1849: Synonym of C. laesus (Wiedemann, 1817)
Chrysotus andorrensis Parent, 1938: Synonym of C. gramineus (Fallén, 1823)
Chrysotus andreji Negrobov, 1986: Synonym of C. andrei Negrobov, 1986
Chrysotus angulicornis Buchmann, 1961: Synonym of C. gramineus (Fallén, 1823)
Chrysotus approximatus (Aldrich, 1896): Synonym of C. spectabilis (Loew, 1861)
Chrysotus arvernicus Vaillant & Brunhes, 1980: Synonym of C. gramineus (Fallén, 1823)
Chrysotus atripes von Roser, 1840: Synonym of C. cupreus Macquart, 1827
Chrysotus azoricus Frey, 1945: Synonym of C. elongatus Parent, 1934
Chrysotus brevispina Van Duzee, 1933: Synonym of C. brevicornis Van Duzee, 1933
Chrysotus callidus Parent, 1944: Synonym of C. cilipes Meigen, 1824
Chrysotus ciliatus Malloch, 1914: Synonym of C. choricus Wheeler, 1890
Chrysotus cobaltinus Van Duzee, 1924: Synonym of C. discolor Loew, 1861
Chrysotus communis Van Duzee, 1932: Synonym of C. vanduzeei (Robinson, 1964)
Chrysotus copiosus Meigen, 1824: Synonym of C. neglectus (Wiedemann, 1817)
Chrysotus costatus Van Duzee, 1915: Synonym of C. costalis Loew, 1861
Chrysotus diligens Parent, 1931: Synonym of C. viridis Becker, 1922
Chrysotus dubius Van Duzee, 1924: Synonym of C. hirtipes Van Duzee, 1924
Chrysotus enderleini Parent, 1938: Synonym of C. laesus (Wiedemann, 1817)
Chrysotus exiguus Van Duzee, 1924: Synonym of C. parvicornis Van Duzee, 1924
Chrysotus exunguis (Thomson, 1869): Synonym of C spectabilis (Loew, 1861)
Chrysotus facialis Gerstäcker, 1864: Synonym of C. gramineus (Fallén, 1823)
Chrysotus fascialis Becker, 1918: Synonym of C. gramineus (Fallén, 1823)
Chrysotus femoralis Meigen, 1824: Synonym of C. neglectus (Wiedemann, 1817)
Chrysotus flavipalpis Van Duzee, 1930: Synonym of C. ochropus Thomson, 1869
Chrysotus flavohirtus Robinson, 1970: Synonym of C. fulvohirtus Van Duzee, 1915
Chrysotus gramineus Meigen, 1838: Synonym of C. varians Kowarz, 1874
Chrysotus infuscatus (Van Duzee, 1915): Synonym of C. leucostoma (Loew, 1861)
Chrysotus insularis (Parent, 1933): Synonym of C. insularis (Lamb, 1933)
Chrysotus intermedius Frey, 1945: Synonym of C. polychaetus Frey, 1945
Chrysotus kowarzi Lundbeck, 1912: Synonym of C. obscuripes Zetterstedt, 1838
Chrysotus laesus (Fallén, 1823): Synonym of C. gramineus (Fallén, 1823)
Chrysotus latifacies Van Duzee, 1933: Synonym of C. brevicornis Van Duzee, 1933
Chrysotus licenti Parent, 1944: Synonym of C. femoratus Zetterstedt, 1843
Chrysotus longipalpus Edwards, 1932: Synonym of C. longipalpus Aldrich, 1896
Chrysotus longipes Van Duzee, 1927: Synonym of C. parvulus (Aldrich, 1896)
Chrysotus lundbladi Frey, 1939: Synonym of C. neglectus (Wiedemann, 1817)
Chrysotus magnipalpus Van Duzee, 1927: Synonym of C. crosbyi Van Duzee, 1924
Chrysotus melanopus Parent, 1926: Synonym of C. cupreus Macquart, 1827
Chrysotus mexicanus Robinson, 1967: Synonym of C. brevicornis Van Duzee, 1933
Chrysotus microcerus Kowarz, 1874: Synonym of C. gramineus (Fallén, 1823)
Chrysotus minimus (Meigen, 1830): Synonym of C. gramineus (Fallén, 1823)
Chrysotus minor Frey, 1945: Synonym of C. polychaetus Frey, 1945
Chrysotus miritibia Parent, 1933: Synonym of C. brevitibia Van Duzee, 1927
Chrysotus nigerrimus Becker, 1918: Synonym of C. alpicola Strobl, 1893
Chrysotus nigripes Meigen, 1824: Mixed species – C. gramineus (Fallén, 1823), C. laesus (Wiedemann, 1817) and C. varians Kowarz, 1874
Chrysotus pallidipalpus Van Duzee, 1933: Synonym of C. longipalpus Aldrich, 1896
Chrysotus plagius (Vanschuytbroeck, 1952): Synonym of C. upembaensis (Vanschuytbroeck, 1952)
Chrysotus pratincola Wheeler, 1890: Synonym of C. subcostatus Loew, 1864
Chrysotus romanicus Pârvu, 1995: Synonym of C. viridifemoratus von Roser, 1840
Chrysotus sagittarius Van Duzee, 1924: Synonym of C. longipalpus Aldrich, 1896
Chrysotus spinifer Malloch, 1914: Synonym of C. palpiger (Wheeler, 1890)
Chrysotus subciliatus Frey, 1945: Synonym of C. elongatus Parent, 1934
Chrysotus taeniomerus Meigen, 1830: Synonym of C. neglectus (Wiedemann, 1817)
Chrysotus varians Kowarz, 1874: Synonym of C. gramineus (Fallén, 1823)
Chrysotus viridulus (Fallén, 1823): Synonym of C. neglectus (Wiedemann, 1817)
Chrysotus vittatas (Van Duzee, 1915): Synonym of C. leucostoma (Loew, 1861)
Chrysotus vittatus (Van Duzee, 1915): Synonym of C. leucostoma (Loew, 1861)
Chrysotus vulgaris Van Duzee, 1933 (preoccupied by Van Duzee, 1924): Synonym of C. longipalpus Aldrich, 1896
Chrysotus wisconensis Foot et al, 1965: Synonym of C. wisconsinensis Wheeler, 1890
Chrysotus zlobini Negrobov, 2000: Synonym of C. zlobiniani Negrobov & Maslova, 1995

The following species were moved to other genera:
Chrysotus abdominalis Say, 1829: moved to Thrypticus
Chrysotus albisignatus Becker, 1924: moved to Sympycnus
Chrysotus americanus (Wheeler, 1896): moved to Achradocera, synonym of Achradocera barbata (Loew, 1861)
Chrysotus angustifacies (Becker, 1922): moved to Achradocera, synonym of Achradocera barbata (Loew, 1861)
Chrysotus annulatus Macquart, 1842: moved to Diaphorus
Chrysotus apicalis Aldrich, 1896: moved to Achradocera, synonym of Achradocera barbata (Loew, 1861)
Chrysotus arcuatus Van Duzee, 1924: moved to Achradocera
Chrysotus barbatus (Loew, 1861): moved to Achradocera
Chrysotus basilaris Curran, 1924: moved to Sympycnus
Chrysotus chilensis Van Duzee, 1930: moved to Achradocera
Chrysotus cinerellus Zetterstedt, 1838: moved to Sympycnus, synonym of Sympycnus pulicarius (Fallén, 1823)
Chrysotus concinnarius Say, 1829: moved to Diaphorus
Chrysotus contractus Van Duzee, 1929: moved to Achradocera
Chrysotus cupreus (Macquart, 1839): moved to Campsicnemus
Chrysotus distendens Meigen, 1824: moved to Nematoproctus
Chrysotus diversus Zetterstedt, 1843: moved to Chrysotimus, synonym of Chrysotimus molliculus (Fallén, 1823)
Chrysotus divisus Strobl, 1880: moved to Thrypticus
Chrysotus edwardsi Van Duzee, 1930: moved to Achradocera
Chrysotus exactus Walker, 1859: moved to Asyndetus
Chrysotus excavatus Van Duzee, 1924: moved to Achradocera
Chrysotus femoralis (Becker, 1922): moved to Achradocera
Chrysotus femoratus Bigot, 1890: moved to Achradocera
Chrysotus flavipes von Roser, 1840: moved to Medetera, synonym of Medetera insignis Girschner, 1888
Chrysotus flaviventris von Roser, 1840: moved to Chrysotimus
Chrysotus flavus Aldrich, 1896: moved to Xanthina
Chrysotus hawaiiensis Grimshaw, 1901: moved to Eurynogaster
Chrysotus incumbens Becker, 1924: moved to Diaphorus
Chrysotus insignis (Parent, 1933): moved to Achradocera
Chrysotus laetus Meigen, 1824: moved to Chrysotimus, synonym of Chrysotimus molliculus (Fallén, 1823)
Chrysotus lividiventris Becker, 1924: moved to Diaphorus
Chrysotus longiseta (Parent, 1933): moved to Achradocera
Chrysotus luctuosus Bigot, 1888: moved to Sympycnus
Chrysotus magnicornis Zetterstedt, 1843: moved to Rhaphium
Chrysotus meridionalis (Becker, 1922): moved to Achradocera
Chrysotus molliculus (Fallén, 1823): moved to Chrysotimus
Chrysotus niger Loew, 1869: moved to Acropsilus
Chrysotus nigricilius Loew, 1871: moved to Melanostolus
Chrysotus nigricosta von Roser, 1840: moved to Teuchophorus
Chrysotus parthenus Hardy & Kohn, 1964: moved to Diaphorus
Chrysotus parvus Van Duzee, 1924: moved to Telmaturgus
Chrysotus pumilus (Meigen, 1824): moved to Syntormon
Chrysotus quadratus Van Duzee, 1924: moved to Thinophilus, synonym of Thinophilus viridifacies Van Duzee, 1924
Chrysotus rhaphioides Zetterstedt, 1838: moved to Hercostomus, synonym of Hercostomus metallicus (Stannius, 1831)
Chrysotus satrapa (Wheeler, 1890): moved to Diaphorus
Chrysotus saxatilis Grimshaw, 1901: moved to Elmoia
Chrysotus shannoni Van Duzee, 1930: moved to Achradocera
Chrysotus signatus Zetterstedt, 1849: moved to Telmaturgus, synonym of Teuchophorus nigricosta (von Roser, 1840)
Chrysotus spiniger Grimshaw, 1901: moved to Eurynogaster
Chrysotus superbus Vanschuytbroeck, 1951: moved to Telmaturgus, synonym of Telmaturgus munroi (Curran, 1925)
Chrysotus thoracicus Philippi, 1865: moved to Achalcus
Chrysotus tuberculatus Van Duzee, 1931: moved to Achradocera
Chrysotus validus Loew, 1861: moved to Achradocera, synonym of Achradocera barbata (Loew, 1861)

The following species were renamed:
Chrysotus aldrichi Van Duzee, 1924: renamed to C. vockerothi Pollet in Pollet, Brooks & Cumming, 2004
Chrysotus annulatus Van Duzee, 1924: renamed to C. millardi Meuffels & Grootaert, 1999
Chrysotus apicalis Parent, 1932: renamed to C. parapicalis Bickel & Dyte, 1989
Chrysotus bicolor Vanschuytbroeck, 1951: renamed to C. pauli Meuffels & Grootaert, 1999
Chrysotus caudatus Van Duzee, 1931: renamed to C. caudatulus Van Duzee, 1932
†Chrysotus concinnus Meunier, 1907: renamed to †C. praeconcinnus Evenhuis, 1994
Chrysotus disjunctus Van Duzee, 1924: renamed to Diaphorus millardi Meuffels & Grootaert, 1999
Chrysotus flavus Vanschuytbroeck, 1957: renamed to C. madagascariensis Dyte & Smith, 1980 (now in Peloropeodes)
Chrysotus infirmus Wei, Zhang & Zhou, 2014: renamed to C. weii Zhou, 2016
Chrysotus magnicornis Parent, 1928: renamed to C. grandicornis Parent, 1930
Chrysotus magnicornis Van Duzee, 1924: renamed to C. megalocerus Meuffels & Grootaert, 1999
Chrysotus minimus Robinson, 1975: renamed to C. microtatus Meuffels & Grootaert, 1999
Chrysotus nudus Harmston & Knowlton, 1963: renamed to C. harmstoni Meuffels & Grootaert, 1999
Chrysotus parvulus Van Duzee, 1924: renamed to C. milvadu Runyon, 2020
Chrysotus quadratus Wang & Yang, 2006: renamed to C. liui Wang & Yang, 2008
Chrysotus setosus Van Duzee, 1931: renamed to C. neotropicus Dyte, 1980
Chrysotus vicinus Parent, 1933: renamed to C. kallweiti Capellari & Amorim, 2014

The following species are nomina nuda:
†Chrysotus antipellus Keilbach, 1982
†Chrysotus apicalis Keilbach, 1982
†Chrysotus ciliatus Keilbach, 1982
†Chrysotus dasycerus Keilbach, 1982
†Chrysotus delecocerus Keilbach, 1982
†Chrysotus furcatus Keilbach, 1982
Chrysotus ringdahli Ringdahl, 1928
Chrysotus rotundus Wei, Zhang & Zhou, 2014
†Chrysotus semiciliatus Keilbach, 1982
†Chrysotus stylatus Keilbach, 1982
†Chrysotus terminaeus Keilbach, 1982
Chrysotus tibialis Stephens, 1829

References

Chrysotus